The 2021 Clemson Tigers football team represented Clemson University during the 2021 NCAA Division I FBS football season. The Tigers were led by head coach Dabo Swinney, in his 14th year. The Tigers competed as a member of the Atlantic Coast Conference (ACC) and played their home games at Memorial Stadium in Clemson, South Carolina.

For the first time since 2014, Clemson did not reach the ACC Championship Game or the College Football Playoff. This season ended the team's streak of six consecutive conference championships, the longest in FBS as of the 2021 season.

The Tigers ended the season with a victory over Iowa State in the Cheez-It Bowl.

Offseason

Recruiting
Clemson's 2021 class consisted of nineteen signees.  The class was ranked first in the ACC and fifth best overall by the 247Sports Composite.

Players leaving for NFL

NFL draftees

Transfers

Preseason transfers

Midseason transfers

Preseason

Award watch lists
Listed in the order that they were released

Schedule

Rankings

Personnel

Coaching Staff

Roster

Game summaries

vs. No. 5 Georgia

South Carolina State

Georgia Tech

at NC State

Boston College

at Syracuse

at No. 23 Pittsburgh

Florida State

at Louisville

UConn

No. 10 Wake Forest

at South Carolina

vs. Iowa State

Awards and honors

Players drafted into the NFL

References

Clemson
Clemson Tigers football seasons
Cheez-It Bowl champion seasons
Clemson Tigers football